Fairview Christian School may refer to:

Fairview Christian School (Albany, Oregon)
Fairview Christian School (Reading, Pennsylvania)